Guadalupe is a town and municipality in the Colombian department of Antioquia. Part of the subregion of Northern Antioquia.

External links
Antioquia Tourism, Guadalupe

Municipalities of Antioquia Department